Bheru Lal Meena (born 1 January, in Teedi, District Udaipur (Rajasthan)) was member of 10th Lok Sabha from Salumber (Lok Sabha constituency) in Rajasthan, India.

He was elected to 11th, 12th and 13th Lok Sabha from Salumber (Lok Sabha constituency).

References

1934 births
People from Udaipur district
India MPs 1991–1996
India MPs 1996–1997
India MPs 1998–1999
India MPs 1999–2004
Rajasthani politicians
Living people
Meena people
Indian National Congress politicians from Rajasthan